Thurloxton is a village and civil parish  north-east of Taunton, and 5 miles south-west of Bridgwater on the south-eastern slopes of the Quantock Hills in the Sedgemoor district of the county of Somerset, in England.

History
The name means 'Through the animal pen' from the Old English purh and locian, or alternatively "Thurlac's tun", the holding of the original Saxon owner Thurlac.

The manor and church were held by the monks of Taunton Priory until the dissolution of the monasteries and after that by the Portmans of Orchard Portman.

Governance
The parish council has responsibility for local issues, including setting an annual precept (local rate) to cover the council’s operating costs and producing annual accounts for public scrutiny. The parish council evaluates local planning applications and works with the local police, district council officers, and neighbourhood watch groups on matters of crime, security and traffic. The parish council's role also includes initiating projects for the maintenance and repair of parish facilities, as well as consulting with the district council on the maintenance, repair, and improvement of highways, drainage, footpaths, public transport and street cleaning. Conservation matters (including trees and listed buildings) and environmental issues are also the responsibility of the council.

The village falls within the non-metropolitan district of Sedgemoor, which was formed on 1 April 1974 under the Local Government Act 1972, having previously been part of Bridgwater Rural District, which is responsible for local planning and building control, local roads, council housing, environmental health, markets and fairs, refuse collection and recycling, cemeteries and crematoria, leisure services, parks and tourism.

Somerset County Council is responsible for running the largest and most expensive local services such as education, social services, libraries, main roads, public transport, policing and fire services, trading standards, waste disposal and strategic planning.

It is also part of the Bridgwater and West Somerset county constituency represented in the House of Commons of the Parliament of the United Kingdom. It elects one Member of Parliament (MP) by the first-past-the-post system of election.

Religious sites
The Norman Church of St Giles dates from the 14th century but is predominantly from the 15th century with 19th-century restoration including the addition of the north aisle in 1868. It has been designated by English Heritage as a Grade II* listed building. From October 1763 to January 1764 the vicar was the diarist James Woodforde. He was followed by the Rev William Boone. who was curate of the parish for 43 years, but was outlasted by his rector, the Rev Charles Russell, who was appointed in 1768 and held the living for 65 years.

References

External links

Thurloxton at British History Online

Villages in Sedgemoor
Civil parishes in Somerset